Ramrao Krishnarao Patil (born 13 Dec 1907, died 1 June 2007 at Nagpur) was an Indian Gandhian and freedom fighter from India.

He was member of the elite Indian Civil Service and worked as district collector in the Central Provinces. He cosigned the Nagpur Pact.

He was member of the first Planning Commission set up by then Prime Minister Jawaharlal Nehru.

He was a recipient of the Jamnalal Bajaj Award in 1997 and was awarded Maharashtra Bhushan Award in 2007 posthumously.

References

1907 births
2007 deaths
Members of the Planning Commission of India
Recipients of the Maharashtra Bhushan Award
Gandhians
Politicians from Nagpur
Indian Civil Service (British India) officers
Marathi people